Sushnevo-2 is a rural locality (a settlement) in Pekshinskoye Rural Settlement, Petushinsky District, Vladimir Oblast, Russia. The population was 94 as of 2010. There are 4 streets.

Geography 
Sushnevo-2 is located, 28 km east of Petushki (the district's administrative centre) by road. Boldino is the nearest rural locality.

References 

Rural localities in Petushinsky District